Reteocrinus is an extinct genus of sea lily that lived in the Middle to Late Ordovician.  Its remains have been found in North America.

Sources 
Reteocrinus in the Field Museum's Evolving Planet

External links
Reteocrinus in the Paleobiology Database

Diplobathrida
Prehistoric crinoid genera
Ordovician crinoids
Ordovician echinoderms of North America
Paleozoic life of Ontario
Verulam Formation